Christopher Henney is a British-American biotechnology company executive and board member. In 1980, he co-founded  Immunex Corp., which was later acquired by Amgen Inc.

Background 
Henney was born on Feb. 4th, 1941, in Potters Hill Aston in Birmingham, UK. He attended Prince Albert School in 1945. In 1952 he attended King Edward VI School until 1959 and went on to study biochemistry at the University of Birmingham, where he earned his B.Sc, his Ph.D. in experimental pathology, and his D.Sc. for his contributions to the field of immunology in 1964. He was recruited by Japanese scientists Teruko and Kimishige Ishizaka to Children’s Asthma Research Institute and Hospital (Denver) in 1966.

He worked as a professor of Immunology at Johns Hopkins between 1972-78. In 1978, Henney was offered the first Chair in Immunology at the Fred Hutchinson Cancer Research Center and a position as an Academic Immunologist at the University of Washington. At that time, the Swiss pharmaceutical company Hoffman-La Roche offered Henney’s research lab $1 million to fund research in exchange for commercial rights to new inventions. Colleagues at the Hutch denied the arrangement.

Dr. Steven Gillis, whom Henney had recruited from Dartmouth to work on cloning interleukin - 2 (IL-2), a protein that regulates the activities of white blood cells, proposed that they form their own company. In 1980, Henney and Gillis co-founded Immunex Corp., a venture-funded biotech company which Amgen, Inc., acquired it in 2002.

Before its acquisition, Immunex (a contraction of immune experiments) had developed, manufactured, and marketed therapeutic products for the treatment of cancer, infectious diseases, and autoimmune disorders, and was responsible for the development of Enbrel, used in the treatment of rheumatoid arthritis: Novantrone, used to treat acute nonlymphocytic leukemia and pain associated with prostate cancer; Leukine, for use in bone marrow transplant patients.

In 1989, Henney, Amgen Founder and CEO, George Ratthman, and Genetic Systems founder Robert Nowinski founded ICOS Corp. The founders raised $33 million in July 1990 from investors, including Bill Gates - who at the time was the largest shareholder and on the board of directors. Gates sat on the ICOS board for 15 years and departed to sit on the Berkshire Hathaway board. Henney was the executive vice president and scientific director from 1989 to 1995. While ICOS was primarily focused on the development of drugs to treat inflammatory disorders they became famous for developing tadalafil (Cialis), a drug used to treat erectile dysfunction.

From 1995 to January 2003, Dr. Henney was chairman and chief executive officer of Dendreon Corporation. Originally named Activated Cell Therapy and founded in 1992 by Stanford scientists, Edgar Engleman and Samuel Strober, Henney ran the company and subsequently moved the company from Palo Alto to his hometown of Seattle, WA, and renamed it Dendreon. Dendreon developed its lead cell-based therapy product Provenge, and in 2010, it became the first FDA-approved therapy for Prostate cancer.

In 2004 he left the company and has gone on to be actively involved as a senior advisor to several biotech companies. He guide start-ups and has presided as chairman or sat on the board of the following companies.

 SGX Pharmaceuticals - 2004 chairman of the board
 Cyclacel Pharmaceuticals - 2004 vice chairman of the board
 Bionomics Ltd. - 2005 board of directors
 Xcyte Therapies - 2005 chairman of the board
 Cascadian Therapeutics - 2006 chairman of the board
 CG Therepuetics - 2007 chairman of the board
 Anthera Pharmaceuticals - 2008 chairman of the board
 AVI Biopharma - 2009 board of directors
 Allostera Pharam - 2010 chairman of the board
 Prothena - 2013 board of directors

Awards and honors 
2011, Dr. Henney was inducted into the Biotech Hall of Fame.

2019, Dr. Henney was inducted into the Washington Life Science Hall of Fame.

References 

American immunologists
British immunologists
1941 births
Living people
English emigrants to the United States
People from Birmingham, West Midlands
People educated at King Edward's School, Birmingham
Alumni of the University of Birmingham
Johns Hopkins University faculty
University of Washington faculty
American biochemists
English biochemists